A total solar eclipse occurred on August 18, 1868, also known as "The King of Siam's eclipse". A solar eclipse occurs when the Moon passes between Earth and the Sun, thereby totally or partly obscuring the image of the Sun for a viewer on Earth. A total solar eclipse occurs when the Moon's apparent diameter is larger than the Sun's, blocking all direct sunlight, turning day into darkness. Totality occurs in a narrow path across Earth's surface, with the partial solar eclipse visible over a surrounding region thousands of kilometres wide.

Observations 

Several expeditions were sent to observe the eclipse.
 One of two expeditions from Germany was sent to Aden. The expedition was led by Gustav Spörer.
 The second expedition was sent to the west coast of India. The expedition was led by Friedrich Tietjen.
Captain Bullock observed from the Celebes sea, sketching the appearance of the corona, while Gustav Fritsch accompanied an expedition to Aden.

Discovery of helium
French astronomer Pierre Janssen observed the eclipse from Guntur in Madras State, British India. It was the first total eclipse since Gustav Kirchhoff's 1859 theory that the Fraunhofer lines in the solar spectrum correspond to the emission line of the different chemical elements present in the Sun. Correspondingly, Janssen observed the eclipse with the aid of a spectroscope. He noticed a bright yellow line (λ = 587.49 nm) in the spectra of the solar prominences that could not be due to sodium as had previously been assumed, and was subsequently able to observe the same line even without the need for an eclipse. The same result was found independently by British astronomer Norman Lockyer, and both Janssen's and Lockyer's communications were presented to the French Academy of Sciences on October 26, 1868.

King Mongkut's calculation 

King Mongkut, also known as Rama IV of Siam, was able to calculate and predict the solar eclipse two years earlier. The calculations were correct as to the place, the time and the type of the solar eclipse that would happen. The eclipse took place precisely as the king had predicted, the total phase lasting six minutes and 46 seconds. In fact, his calculations were better — by about two seconds  — than those of the French astronomers, who acknowledged his accuracy. Mongkut was exposed to malaria, then developed chills and fever. He died on October 1, 1868. According to the Thai Astronomical Society and NASA, this eclipse is known as "The King of Siam's eclipse".

Related eclipses 
It is a part of solar Saros 133.

Inex series 
Solar Inex series 2013 May 10
 Saros 131: Annular Solar Eclipse of 1810 Sep 28
 Saros 132: Annular Solar Eclipse of 1839 Sep 07
 Saros 133: Total Solar Eclipse of 1868 Aug 18
 Saros 134: Annular Solar Eclipse of 1897 Jul 29
 Saros 135: Annular Solar Eclipse of 1926 Jul 09
 Saros 136: Total Solar Eclipse of 1955 Jun 20
 Saros 137: Annular Solar Eclipse of 1984 May 30
 Saros 138: Annular Solar Eclipse of 2013 May 10
 Saros 139: Total Solar Eclipse of 2042 Apr 20
 Saros 140: Annular Solar Eclipse of 2071 Mar 31
 Saros 141: Annular Solar Eclipse of 2100 Mar 10
 Saros 142: Total Solar Eclipse of 2129 Feb 18
 Saros 143: Annular Solar Eclipse of 2158 Jan 30
 Saros 144: Annular Solar Eclipse of 2187 Jan 09

Notes

References
 NASA chart graphics
 Googlemap
 NASA Besselian elements
 www.starwrite.org: Solar Astronomy in 1868 
 Observations of the Total Solar Eclipse of August 18, 1868 by Charles G. Perrins
 Drawing of Corona
 

1868 08 18
1868 in science
1868 08 18
Helium
August 1868 events
Astronomy in Thailand